Gyong La is a mountain pass situated on Saltoro Ridge southwest of the vast Siachen Glacier, some  directly north of map point NJ9842 which defined the end of the 1972 Line of Control between India and Pakistan. With Pakistan controlling areas just to the west along Chumik Glacier, the immediate Gyong La area has been under India's control since 1989. Dozens of Indian military tents and other equipment are visible in 2013 and 2016 Google Earth imagery 100 meters east, 670 meters northeast, and 2.7 km east-northeast of Gyong La, linked by clear trails.  Nearer the former Pakistani "Naveed Top" position and 3.85 km west-northwest of Gyong La is a post and helipad is visible in 2001 and 2016 Google Earth imagery at  elevation, higher than both the Indian positions and Gyong La.

Background

Indo-Pak conflicts

Starting in 1984 during Operation Meghdoot, the first military action of the Siachen Conflict, which itself was part of a larger Kashmir Conflict, there was military action at Gyong La, and nearby passes Sia La and Bilafond La.  Since 1989 Gyong La has been controlled by Indian forces, with Pakistani forces controlling areas i.e. Gyong and Chumik glaciers to the west.

In March 1989, Operation Ibex by the Indian Army attempted to seize the Pakistani post overlooking the Chumik Glacier. The operation was unsuccessful at dislodging Pakistani troops from their positions. The Indian Army under Brig. R. K. Nanavatty then launched an artillery attack on Kauser Base, the Pakistani logistical node on Chumik Glacier. The destruction of Kauser Base induced Pakistani troops to vacate their Chumik posts just west of Gyong La, and Operation Ibex concluded.

In June 1999 during the Kargil War, the Indian Army under Brig. P. C. Katoch, Col. Konsam Himalaya Singh seized control of Pt 5770 (which was earlier called Cheema Top & Bilal Top by Pakistan, was renamed to Navdeep Top after victory by India) on the southern edge of the Saltoro defence line, about 20 km southwest of Gyong La, from Pakistan troops. During the capture of Pt 5770 by India, Pakistani Army Captain Taimur Malik of Special Service Group and few other Pakistani soldiers were killed. Pakistan had earlier denied the role of its soldiers in Kargil War and had refused to accept its dead soldiers. However, later Taimur Malik's grandfather made a personal appeal to Indian High Commission (IHC) in London for the return of bodies, the request was forwarded to India's Chief of Army Staff General Malik General Ved Prakash Malik who had the bodies exhumed and sent to Pakistan.

See also
 Borders
 Actual Ground Position Line (AGPL)
 India–Pakistan International Border {IB)
 Line of Control {LoC)
 Line of Actual Control (LAC)
 Sir Creek (SC)
 Borders of China
 Borders of India
 Borders of Pakistan

 Conflicts
 Kashmir conflict
 Siachen conflict
 Sino-Indian conflict
 List of disputed territories of China
 List of disputed territories of India
 List of disputed territories of Pakistan
 Northern Areas
 Trans-Karakoram Tract

 Operations
 Operation Meghdoot, by India
 Operation Rajiv, by India
 Operation Safed Sagar, by India

 Other related topics
 Awards and decorations of the Indian Armed Forces
 Bana Singh, after whom Quaid Post was renamed to Bana Top 
 Dafdar, westernmost town in Trans-Karakoram Tract
 India-China Border Roads
 Sino-Pakistan Agreement for transfer of Trans-Karakoram Tract to China

References

External links 
 Siachen Peace Park

Mountain passes of Ladakh
Mountain passes of the Himalayas
Mountain passes of the Karakoram